Surrey—White Rock—South Langley (formerly known as Surrey—White Rock, South Surrey—White Rock and Surrey) was a federal electoral district in British Columbia, Canada, that was represented in the House of Commons of Canada from 1968 to 1979 and from 1988 to 1997.

Geography 
This electoral district included the City of White Rock, the southern portions of the Township of Langley, and the City of Surrey.

History 

This riding was created in 1966 as "Surrey" from New Westminster riding.

In 1971, it was renamed "South Surrey—White Rock".

In 1976, South Surrey—White Rock was abolished and redistributed into Fraser Valley West  and Surrey—White Rock—North Delta ridings.

The riding was re-created in 1987 as "Surrey—White Rock" from Fraser Valley West  and Surrey—White Rock—North Delta ridings.

In 1990, it was renamed "Surrey—White Rock—South Langley".

In 1996, it was abolished, with parts of it going to form South Surrey—White Rock—Langley riding.

Members of Parliament

This riding elected the following Members of Parliament:

Election results

Surrey—White Rock—South Langley

Surrey—White Rock

See also 

 List of Canadian federal electoral districts
 Past Canadian electoral districts

External links 
 Library of Parliament Riding Profile 1987-1990
 Library of Parliament Riding Profile 1990-1996
 Website of the Parliament of Canada

Former federal electoral districts of British Columbia